Alexander, Alex or Lex Bell may refer to:

People
 Alexander Bell (California merchant) (1801–1871), member of the Los Angeles Common Council
 Alexander Montgomerie Bell (1806–1866), Scottish writer on law
 Alexander Melville Bell (1819–1905), Scottish-American philologist, researcher, teacher, and father of Alexander Graham Bell
 Alexander Graham Bell (1847–1922), Scottish-Canadian scientist, engineer, teacher and inventor
 Alexander Bell (Victorian politician) (1850–1931), Australian politician
 Alexander Dunlop Bell (1873–1937), Chairman of the Shanghai Municipal Council, 1932–1934
 Alex Bell (1882–1934), Scottish footballer (Manchester United, Blackburn Rovers, Scotland)
 Alexander Bell (sportsman) (1915–1956), Argentine born English cricketer and rugby union player
 Alexander F. Bell (1915–1986), American football player for the Detroit Lions and head college football coach at Villanova University
 Alex Bell (footballer, born 1931), Scottish footballer (Partick Thistle, Exeter City, Grimsby Town)
 Lex Bell (Alexander James Douglas Bell, born 1945), Australian politician
 Alex Bell, contestant on Survivor: The Amazon (2003)
 Sandy Bell (Alexander John Bell, 1906–1985), South African cricketer

Characters
 Alex Bell (Hollyoaks), a character in the British soap opera Hollyoaks

See also 
 Alexander Bell Patterson (1911–1993), Canadian MP